Edward Wigglesworth (1732–1794), the son of Edward Michael Wigglesworth (c. 1693–1765), occupied the Hollis Chair of divinity at the Harvard Divinity School from 1765 to 1792. His father had been the first to hold that position. 

He graduated from Harvard University in 1749. He was a charter member of the American Academy of Arts and Sciences (1780).

Archives and records
Edward Wigglesworth business records at Baker Library Special Collections, Harvard Business School.

References

Harvard Divinity School faculty
1732 births
1794 deaths
Fellows of the American Academy of Arts and Sciences
People from Cambridge, Massachusetts
People of colonial Massachusetts
Harvard University alumni